The Unite Group (trading as Unite Students) provides purpose built student accommodation (PBSA) across the United Kingdom.

The company is listed on the London Stock Exchange as a constituent of the FTSE 100 Index.

History

The Unite Group was founded by Nicholas Porter in Bristol, England, in 1991. Aged 21 and following research with the University of the West of England, he recognised a growing demand for student accommodation. After a period of expansion within Bristol, in 1998 Unite opened its first properties in London. It listed on the Alternative Investment Market the following year.

In 2000 the business moved its share register to the London Stock Exchange, and opened properties in Manchester, Liverpool and Portsmouth. During the following decade, Unite created investment vehicles to secure growth in London, across England and into Scotland. Of these vehicles, The Unite UK Student Accommodation Fund (USAF) is Europe's largest fund focusing solely on direct-let student accommodation. In 2006, Porter announced he was stepping down as chief executive. He was succeeded at the end of the year by chief financial officer Mark Allan.

Former National Express chief executive Phil White became non-executive chairman in May 2009, succeeding Geoffrey Maddrell, after ten years in the role. By 2011 the business had grown to 40,000 beds. It remains the UK's largest provider of student accommodation by capacity, but second to IQ Student Accommodation by value of its portfolio of property.

In 2012 it founded charitable trust The Unite Foundation, which provides free accommodation and a cost-of-living allowance to students from "challenging circumstances". In April 2014 Unite renamed itself "Unite Students". Simultaneously, it launched its "Home for Success" corporate philosophy; which it describes as its "business purpose". The Home for Success announcement included a £40m reinvestment of profits into the business and 16 "signature commitments", all of which relate to an improved student experience.

Unite Group converted to a real estate investment trust with effect from 1 January 2017.

In November 2019, the Competition and Markets Authority approved the proposed acquisition by the company of its competitor, Liberty Living, for £1.4 billion. The transaction was completed in December 2019.

On 1 June 2022, it was announced that it will be promoted from the FTSE 250, and became a constituent of the FTSE 100 Index effective on 20 June.

Operations
The company provides residential accommodation to around 74,000 students across 123 buildings across the UK, and is the largest and oldest PBSA provider in the country.

Notable properties
 Grand Central - Liverpool
 Sky Plaza - Leeds
 Liberty Park - Leicester

References

External links 
Official site

Real estate companies established in 1991
Companies based in Bristol
Companies listed on the London Stock Exchange
Student housing
1991 establishments in England
Real estate investment trusts of the United Kingdom